Nicolae Bulat (10 February 1952 – 9 September 2022) was a Moldovan historian and director of Soroca Museum of History and Ethnography (including Soroca Fortress).

Bulat was a candidate of the Liberal Democratic Party of Moldova in April 2009 and July 2009.

Biography
Nicolae Bulat was born on 10 February 1952 in the Cureșnița village, Soroca District. He graduated from the secondary school № 1 from Soroca, and then entered the Moldova State University from Chișinău at the Faculty of Foreign Languages, a section of English language and literature.

Bulat was often called the guardian of the Soroca Fortress, in which he had been working for more than 30 years, he was considered one of the best guides in Moldova.

Awards
 Order of the Star of Romania, 2000.

References

External links 
Soroceanul Nicolae Bulat – intelectual european, autor de carti de istorie si cavaler al ordinului „Steaua Romaniei” – a implinit 55 de ani – El nu-si tradeaza meseria, desi ridica lunar un salariu modic de circa 45 USD
Un cronicar modern, in Cetatea Soroca 
.

1952 births
2022 deaths
Moldova State University alumni
20th-century Moldovan historians
Moldovan male writers
Moldovan activists
21st-century Moldovan historians
People from Soroca District
Romanian people of Moldovan descent
Recipients of the Order of the Star of Romania
20th-century male writers
21st-century male writers